Gerald McBoing-Boing is a 2D animated children's television series based on the 1950 animated short film Gerald McBoing-Boing. It premiered on Cartoon Network in the United States on August 22, 2005, as part of their then-Tickle-U programming block, and on Teletoon in English and French in Canada on August 29, 2005. The show would later be reran on Boomerang around 2007. It uses the same basic art style as the original, but with more detail. Each 11-minute episode features a series of vignettes with Gerald, of which the "fantasy tales" are done in Seussian rhyme. There are also sound checks, gags, and "real-life" portions of the show, It was also internationally broadcast on ABC Kids in Australia. and on Peacock in United States 

Gerald still only makes sounds (and, unlike the UPA specials, is actually praised for it), but he now has two speaking friends, Janine and Jacob, as well as a dog named Burp, who only burps (accompanied by someone, usually Gerald's mother, saying "excuse me" afterwards). Gerald's parents (names unknown) also fill out the regular cast. The television series was produced in Canada by Cookie Jar Entertainment, and directed by Robin Budd and story edited/written by John Derevlany. The animation was done by Mercury Filmworks in Ottawa and Vancouver. The music and score for the series was composed by Ray Parker and Tom Szczesniak.

Cast
 Glenn Barna as Gerald
 Linda Ballantyne as Gerald's Mother
 Patrick McKenna as Gerald's Father
 Samantha Weinstein as Janine
 Joanne Vannicola as Jacob
 Deann DeGruijter as Narrator

Episodes and segments
52 segments in 26 episodes were produced:

 "Cuckoos & Pirates" "Parades, Honking & Mumbling Mummies"
 "Monkeys, Wrestling & The World's Greatest Super Spy" "The Dentist, The Sheep & The Two Anniversary Gifts"
 "Ghosts, Owls & An Evil Witch" "Art, Glass & The Deep Dark Jungle"
 "Carnivals, Phones & Sneezing Dragons" "Cars, Bees & Magic Puppies"
 "Good Deeds, Librarians & Aliens" "Tornado, Chicken & Circus"
 "Burp, Cry Baby Blues & The Return of Scritchy McBeard" "Videos, Cats & Superheroes"
 "Dog Tricks, Spare Change & The Lost Snowmen" "Mini-Golf, Checkers & Bad Manners"
 "Swings, Cans & The Flying Ace" "Photos, Radios & Knights"
 "Hot Rod, Elevators & Genie Meanie" "Cheese, Birds & Cave Kids"
 "Escapes, Hide-N-Seek & The Beanstalk" "Haircuts, Opera & The Albino Alligator"
 "Camping, Watchdogs & Janinerella" "Hardware, Hair & Hairy Weather"
 "Thin Ice, Squeaky Shoes & Leprechauns" "Museum, Coyotes & A Race Around the World"
 "Hopscotch, Hugs & Hunchbacks" "Lost Dogs, Horses & Monsters"
 "Sleepover, Chalkboard & Trojan Cow" "Popcorn, Shadows & 20,000 Boings Under the Sea"
 "Burping Hero, Dog Whistle & The Incredible Shrinking Gerald" "Play, Cleaning & The Royal Crown Quest"
 "Telescopes, Hiccups & The Boing Boing Express" "Book Clubs, Broccoli & The Mighty Ding Dong"
 "Loud, Drive-thru & Ben Hur" "Stings, Beeps & Pings"
 "Monsters, Snowblowers & The Planet Bedtime" "Fairs, Mimes & Dragons"
 "Doctor, Pigeons & Gerald McShakespeare" "Baby Sister, Chalk & King Gerald"
 "Ice, Fog & Wolves" "Auctions, Soda Pop & The Surfing Thief"
 "Karate, Slurps & Wrinklystiltskin" "Tap-Dancing, Convertibles & The Three Musketeers"
 "Magic, Showers & Mermaids" "Lunchboxes, Car Wash & Robot Jacob"
 "Planes, Parrots & Party Clothes" "Growls, Paper & Flying Horses"
 "Fish, Skis & Rocket Ships" "Rockstar, Strongman & Name that Sound"
 "Sports, Banks & Queen Long Big Nose the Third" "Pinball, Parks & Princesses"
 "Red Light, Rain & Sneezing Flowers" "Arcades, Scanners & News"

References

External links
 

2000s American animated television series
2000s American surreal comedy television series
2005 American television series debuts
2007 American television series endings
2000s Canadian animated television series
2005 Canadian television series debuts
2007 Canadian television series endings
American children's animated comedy television series
American children's animated fantasy television series
Canadian children's animated comedy television series
Canadian children's animated fantasy television series
DreamWorks Classics
English-language television shows
UPA series and characters
Television shows based on works by Dr. Seuss
Television series by Cookie Jar Entertainment
Television series by DHX Media
Teletoon original programming
Cartoonito original programming
Television series by Universal Television
Animated television series about children
Television shows about disability
Universal Kids original programming
Cartoon Network original programming